Volodymyr Serhiyovych Odaryuk (born 13 February 1994) is a Ukrainian professional footballer who plays as a striker for Oleksandriya.

Career
Odaryuk is a product of FC Vorskla Poltava youth system where he played in the Ukrainian Premier League Reserves club FC Vorskla Poltava. 

In summer 2015 Odaryuk was promoted to the main squad in the Ukrainian Premier League. He made his debut against FC Karpaty Lviv on 18 October 2015.

On 2 July 2022 he moved to Inhulets Petrove.

References

External links 
 
 
 Одарюк Володимир Сергійович  at The Ukrainian Premier League

1994 births
Living people
Ukrainian footballers
Association football forwards
FC Vorskla Poltava players
FC Hirnyk-Sport Horishni Plavni players
MFC Mykolaiv players
FC Oleksandriya players
FC Inhulets Petrove players
Ukrainian Premier League players
Ukrainian First League players